HAT-P-26 is a K-type main-sequence star about 302 light-years away. Survey in 2015 did not find any stellar companions on orbit around it, although a red dwarf companion with a temperature 4000 K is suspected on wide orbit.

Planetary system
In 2010 a transiting hot Neptune like planet was detected. The transiting planet HAT-P-26b was detected by the HATNet Project using telescopes located in Hawaii and Arizona. The planet is likely formed by pebble accretion mechanism.
The transmission spectrum of the HAT-P-26b was taken in the 2015, with best fit favouring either cloudless atmosphere or atmosphere with low-lying cloud deck. The atmospheric composition of the planet was measured in 2019, and the water vapor volume fraction of 1.5% was detected. The HAT-P-26 is carbon depleted, C/O ratio been constrained to less than 0.33. Also, atmosphere contains light metal hydrides. The measured planetary temperature is equal to 563 K.

In 2019, the transit timing variation analysis of HAT-P-26b, has indicated a presence of the second planet in the system on the wide, 1141-days orbit.

In August 2022, this planetary system was included among 20 systems to be named by the third NameExoWorlds project.

In 2023, the atmosphere of planet was confirmed to contain 12 percents of steam at temeprature 590K.

References

Virgo (constellation)
K-type main-sequence stars
Planetary systems with one confirmed planet
Planetary transit variables